Isaac Robert Randell (February 15, 1871 – January 15, 1942) was a mariner and politician in Newfoundland. He represented Trinity in the Newfoundland House of Assembly from 1923 to 1928.

The son of John Randell and Mary Fowler, he was born in Port Rexton and was educated there and at the Navigation School in St. John's. He left school at a young age to work with his father in the Labrador fishery. He earned his mate's certificate in 1892 and his master's certification in 1895. Randell was first given command of a ship in 1895. He later commanded vessels engaged in Arctic exploration for the government of Canada.

Randell was commander of the Bellaventure which rescued 420 members of the crew of the SS Newfoundland who had survived what is now known as the 1914 sealing disaster. The men had endured two nights of freezing rain and blowing snow on the North Atlantic ice fields without shelter or food. One of the rescued men died shortly afterwards in St. John's where the survivors had been brought for medical care. The crew of the Bellaventure also recovered the bodies of 69 men who had not survived the ordeal.

Randell joined A.H. Murray and Co. in 1920, was their agent in Brazil for 14 months and later became a director for the firm.

In 1903, he married Effie Beatrice Taylor. The couple had two sons and five daughters.

Randell was first elected to the Newfoundland assembly in 1923 and was reelected in 1924. He was named to the Legislative Council of Newfoundland in 1931. He died in St. John's in 1942.

Ship's Commanded
 Plymouth
 Belle of the Exe
 SS Regulus
 SS Bellaventure
 SS Bonaventure
 Sheba
 SS Njord
 SS Seal
 SS Sagona

References 

1871 births
1942 deaths
People from Port Rexton
Liberal Party of Newfoundland and Labrador MHAs
Members of the Legislative Council of Newfoundland
Sea captains
Dominion of Newfoundland politicians
Canadian sailors